Warlock II: The Exiled is a 4X turn-based strategy video game developed by 1C:Ino-Co Plus and published by Paradox Interactive. It was released for Microsoft Windows on 10 April 2014. It is the sequel to Warlock: Master of the Arcane

Gameplay

Like its predecessor, Warlock II: The Exiled is a 4X turn-based strategy game where players and engage in world conquest against one another across a world map.

Reception
Following its release, Warlock II: The Exiled currently has an average critic score of 73/100 on the review aggregator website Metacritic. Reviews were generally favorable. PC Games (Germany) states "Ino-Co Plus has done a good job of adding clever features to the established formula." Most criticism asserted a marginal improvement from the original with major problems remaining and fails to sustain interest of those who have played the original.

Warlock 2: Wrath of the Nagas
Warlock 2: Wrath of the Nagas is the first expansion pack to Warlock II, released on 21 October 2014.

References

External links
Official website

2014 video games
1C Company games
4X video games
Fantasy video games
Paradox Interactive games
Turn-based strategy video games
Video games developed in Russia
Video games with expansion packs
Windows games
Linux games
MacOS games
Video games with Steam Workshop support